The 2006 Top League Challenge Series was the 2006 edition of the Top League Challenge Series, a second-tier rugby union competition in Japan, in which teams from regionalised leagues competed for promotion to the Top League for the 2006–07 season. The competition was contested from 15 to 28 January 2006.

Coca-Cola West Red Sparks and IBM Big Blue won promotion to the 2006–07 Top League, while Honda Heat, Kintetsu Liners, Kyuden Voltex and NTT Communications Shining Arcs progressed to the promotion play-offs.

Competition rules and information

The top two teams from the regional Top East League, Top West League and Top Kyūshū League qualified to the Top League Challenge Series. The regional league winners participated in Challenge 1, while the runners-up participated in Challenge 2.

The top two teams in Challenge 1 won automatic promotion to the 2006–07 Top League, while the third-placed team in Challenge 1 and the three Challenge 2 teams qualified to the promotion play-offs.

Qualification

The teams qualified to the Challenge 1 and Challenge 2 series through the 2005 regional leagues.

Top West League

The final standings for the 2005 Top West League were:

 Kintetsu Liners qualified for Challenge 1.
 Honda Heat qualified for Challenge 2.

Top East League

The final standings for the 2005 Top East League were:

 IBM Big Blue qualified for Challenge 1.
 NTT Communications Shining Arcs qualified for Challenge 2 after a play-off series involving them, Akita Northern Bullets and Mitsubishi Sagamihara DynaBoars.

The following matches were played:

 The Top East League (East) and Top East League (North) merged for 2006; Akita Northern Bullets joined the merged Top East League, while Funaoka SDF Wild Boars, North Force and NTT Burns joined lower leagues.

Top Kyūshū League

The final standings for the 2005 Top Kyūshū League were:

 Coca-Cola West Red Sparks, Kyuden Voltex and Mazda Blue Zoomers qualified to the Second Phase.

 Fukuoka Sanix Blues qualified for Challenge 1.
 Coca-Cola West Red Sparks qualified for Challenge 2.

Challenge 1

Standings

The final standings for the 2006 Top League Challenge 1 were:

 Coca-Cola West Red Sparks and IBM Big Blue won promotion to the 2006–07 Top League.
 Kintetsu Liners progressed to the promotion play-offs.

Matches

The following matches were played in the 2006 Top League Challenge 1:

Challenge 2

Standings

The final standings for the 2006 Top League Challenge 2 were:

 Honda Heat, Kyuden Voltex and NTT Communications Shining Arcs progressed to the promotion play-offs.

Matches

The following matches were played in the 2006 Top League Challenge 2:

See also

 2005–06 Top League
 Top League Challenge Series

References

2006 Challenge
2005–06 in Japanese rugby union
2006 rugby union tournaments for clubs